Gods & Goddesses is the ninth solo album released from desert rock artist Brant Bjork. It features an all-new band lineup, including Billy Cordell (ex-bassist of Yawning Man).

Track listing

Personnel
Brant Bjork – guitar, vocals
Billy Cordell – bass
Brandon Henderson – guitar
Giampaolo Farnedi – drums

Credits
Produced by Ethan Allen & Brant Bjork
Recorded and mixed by Ethan Allen & Jim Watts
Mastered by Bruce Barielle
Art direction and design: Cale Bunker
Photography: Rich Sibbald
Photo assistant and spiritual advisor: Eric Allward
Hot chica: Amanda Limon
Bad ride: Scotty Diablo
2010 Dune Boogie Tunez BMI

Notes
The album was re-released in 2020 with new artwork via Bjork's current label, Heavy Psych Sounds.

References

2010 albums
Brant Bjork albums